The Oophorini form an accepted taxonomic tribe within the Elateridae (click beetle) subfamily Agrypninae.

Genera
Aeoloderma Fleutiaux, 1928
Aeoloides Schwarz, 1906
Aeolosomus Dolin, 1982
Aeolus Eschscholtz, 1829
Apochresis Candèze, 1882
Babadrasterius Ôhira, 1994
Deronocus Johnson, 1997
Drasterius Eschscholtz, 1829
Gahanus Platia, 2012
Grammephorus Solier, 1851
Hartenius Platia, 2007
Heteroderes Latreille, 1834
Melanthoides Candèze, 1865
Monocrepidius Eschscholtz, 1829 (syn. = Conoderus)
Nanseia Kishii, 1985
Neodrasterius Kishii, 1966
Pachyderes Guérin-Méneville, 1829
Paraheteroderes Girard, 2017
Phedomenus Candèze, 1889
Pseudaeolus Candèze, 1891
Telesus Candèze, 1880

References

Elateridae
Beetle tribes